High Junk Peak is a mountain inside Clear Water Bay Country Park, Sai Kung, New Territories, Hong Kong, with a height of .

Geography 

High Junk Peak is the highest peak in the Clear Water Bay Peninsula region. To the north lies a mountain called Miu Tsai Tun.

The High Junk Peak Country Trail runs through the foot of High Junk Peak, west of the Summit. The are no roads that lead to the summit. The trails to the summit are rather rocky and steep, and not maintained by the government, so proper hiking footwear is advisable.

High Junk Peak is considered by hikers as one of the three sharp peaks in Hong Kong because of its precipitous incline.

Geology 

High Junk Peak is formed by Volcanic rocks, like many of the tallest mountains in Hong Kong, such as Tai Mo Shan. Some shorter mountains in Hong Kong are formed by older Granitic rocks.

References

External links 
 High Junk Peak Country Trail

See also
 List of mountains, peaks and hills in Hong Kong
Miu Tsai Tun
Clear Water Bay Country Park

Clear Water Bay Peninsula
Mountains, peaks and hills of Hong Kong